The Fåhraeus–Lindqvist effect  describes how the viscosity of a fluid, in this case blood, changes with the diameter of the tube it travels through. In particular there is a 'decrease in viscosity as the tube's diameter decreases' (although only with a tube diameter of between 10 and 300 micrometers). This is because erythrocytes move over to the centre of the vessel, leaving only plasma near the wall of the vessel.

History 
The effect was first documented by a German group in 1930.  Shortly after, in 1931, it was reported independently by the Swedish scientists Robin Fåhræus and Torsten Lindqvist, after whom the effect is commonly named. Robert (Robin) Sanno Fåhræus was a Swedish pathologist and hematologist, born on October 15, 1888, in Stockholm. He died on September 18, 1968, in Uppsala, Sweden. Johan Torsten Lindqvist was a Swedish physician, who was born in 1906 and died in 2007. Fåhræus and Lindqvist published their article in the American Journal of Physiology in 1931 describing the effect. Their study represented an important advance in the understanding of hemodynamics which had widespread implications for the study of human physiology.
They forced blood through fine glass capillary tubes connecting two reservoirs. Capillary diameters were less than 250 μm, and experiments were conducted at sufficiently high shear rates (≥100 1/s) so that a similar flow in a large tube would be effectively Newtonian. After correcting for entrance effects, they presented their data in terms of an effective viscosity, derived from fitting measured pressure drop and volume flow rate to Hagen–Poiseuille equation for a tube of radius R

where:
 is the volumetric flow rate
 is the pressure drop across the capillary
 is the length of capillary
 is the effective viscosity
 is the radius
 is the mathematical constant

Although the Hagen–Poiseuille equation is only valid for a Newtonian fluid, fitting experimental data to this equation provides a convenient method of characterizing flow resistance by a single number, namely . In general,  will depend on the fluid being tested, the capillary diameter, and the flow rate (or pressure drop). However, for a given fluid and a fixed pressure drop, data can be compared between capillaries of differing diameter.
Fahraeus and Lindqvist noticed two unusual features of their data. First,  decreased with decreasing capillary radius, R. This decrease was most pronounced for capillary diameters < 0.5mm. Second, the tube hematocrit (i.e., the average hematocrit in the capillary) was always less than the hematocrit in the feed reservoir. The ratio of these two hematocrits, the tube relative hematocrit, is defined as

Explanation of phenomena

These initially confusing results can be explained by the concept of a plasma cell-free layer, a thin layer adjacent to the capillary wall that is depleted of red blood cells. Because the cell-free layer is red cell-poor, its effective viscosity is lower than that of whole blood. This layer therefore acts to reduce flow resistance within the capillary. This has the net effect that the effective viscosity is less than that for whole blood. Because the cell-free layer is very thin (approximately 3 μm) this effect is insignificant in capillaries whose diameter is large. This explanation, while accurate, is ultimately unsatisfying, since it fails to answer the fundamental question of why a plasma cell-free layer exists. There are actually two factors which promote cell-free layer formation.
 For particles flowing in a tube, there is a net hydrodynamic force that tends to force the particles towards the center of the capillary. This has been cited as the Segré–Silberberg effect, although the named effect pertains to dilute suspensions, and may not operate in the case of concentrated mixtures. There are also effects associated with deformability of red blood cells that might increase this force.
 It is clear that red blood cells cannot pass through the capillary wall, which implies that the centers of red blood cells must lie at least one red blood cell half-thickness away from the wall. This means that, on average, there will be more red blood cells near the center of the capillary than very near the wall.
Cell-free marginal layer model is a mathematical model which tries to explain Fåhræus–Lindqvist effect mathematically.

See also
Cell-free marginal layer model
Fåhræus effect
Blood viscosity
hemodynamics

References

Further reading 

 

Blood
Robin Fåhræus